Catalina Parot Donoso (born 9 March 1956) is a Chilean lawyer, entrepreneur and politician currently serving as president of the National Television Council. 

She served as Minister of National Assets during the first presidency of Sebastián Piñera, between March 2010 and November 2012.

References

Living people
1956 births
Government ministers of Chile
Women government ministers of Chile
Evópoli politicians
National Renewal (Chile) politicians